Jan Nezmar (born 5 July 1977 in Opava) is a former Czech football player who played as a striker or central defender, and is the director of football of Slavia Prague. He spent a large portion of his active career in the Czech club Slovan Liberec, where he was also club captain for several years. He is the top scorer in the history of the club.

Nezmar started his football career in a small village of Hlavnice. After a couple of years there young Nezmar moved to the Czech third division, to play for MSA Dolní Benešov. In 1998, he transferred to the town where he was born, Opava. At SFC Opava Nezmar gained experience and two years later was bought by Slovan Liberec. Together with midfielder Václav Koloušek and striker Jiří Štajner, he helped form the main offensive force of the team. In 2002 Slovan Liberec celebrated its first league title, as Nezmar scored 14 goals and was one of the keys to the unexpected victory.

The following season Jan Nezmar changed his employer again. He would go on to spend two years at Slovácko before moving on to Slovakia to join ambitious Corgoň liga club Ružomberok, signed as an experienced striker with recognised goalscoring ability. In his first season with the club, Ružomberok celebrated winning both the league title and the domestic cup, Nezmar scoring 17 goals. In January 2007 he signed a contract which took him back to his former club Slovan Liberec. On 29 April 2011 he scored his 100th league goal during the home match against Bohemians 1905. On 12 November 2012, he announced his intention to retire as a player and take on a staff role in FC Slovan Liberec. He played his final match on 19 November 2012 against FC Viktoria Plzeň.

References

External links 
 Club Profile 
 Profile on fotbal.idnes.cz 

1977 births
Czech footballers
Czech expatriate footballers
Living people
Czech First League players
FC Slovan Liberec players
1. FC Slovácko players
SFC Opava players
MFK Ružomberok players
Slovak Super Liga players
Expatriate footballers in Slovakia
Czech expatriate sportspeople in Slovakia
Expatriate footballers in Germany
Czech expatriate sportspeople in Germany
Sportspeople from Opava
FC Dolní Benešov players
Association football forwards
FC Oberlausitz Neugersdorf players
Association football central defenders
SK Slavia Prague non-playing staff